Jerry O'Sullivan (born 1951) is an Irish  Gaelic games administrator. He has been the Chairman of the Munster Council since 2016.

Born in Cloyne, County Cork, O'Sullivan first played competitive hurling at juvenile and underage levels with Cloyne. He subsequently joined the club's senior team and won county championship medals in both the junior and intermediate grades.

O'Sullivan was still active as a club player when he became involved in the administrative affairs of the Gaelic Athletic Association. He was elected chairman of the Cloyne club in 1976, a position he held for sixteen years. O'Sullivan also served as public relations officer of the East Cork Board before being elected chairman for a five-year term in 1992.

As a member of the Cork County Board, O'Sullivan filled the roles of youth officer, coaching officer, vice-chairman and chairman from 2009 until 2011. He was simultaneously elected to the Munster Council before being elected chairman for a three-year term in 2016.

O'Sullivan's sons, Diarmuid and Paudie, have played hurling at all levels with Cork.

References

1951 births
Living people
Chairmen of county boards of the Gaelic Athletic Association
Cloyne Gaelic footballers
Cloyne hurlers
Cork County Board administrators
Dual players
Gaelic games club administrators
Munster Provincial Council administrators